Old Cow vs Tender Grass is a 2010 Singaporean comedy film, directed by Chi Kai Fok  and starring Henry Thia and Crystal Lin.

Plot
At 49, Singaporean taxi driver Moo (Henry Thia) is still trying to find a lifelong companion. He encounters the young but eccentric Moon (Crystal Lin), who is always seen with her pet, Bubbles (the dog), and feeding stray animals, after taking her as a passenger, and takes a liking. Meanwhile his best friend and colleague, also a taxi driver (Jack Lim), is also trying to find love and finds success when he meets a dashing beer girl from China with the name of Xiao Hong (Siau Jia Hui).

Cast
 Henry Thia as Moo
 Crystal Lin as Moon
 Jack Lim as Prince Gao
 Jia Hui Siau as Xiao Hong
 Nathaniel Ho as Nat Lee
 Luis Lim Yong Kun as Wu
 Tony Koh Beng Hoe as taxi driver
 Ix Shen as Traffic Policeman
 Dick Su as Unfilial Son
 Alaric Tay as Colleague

References

External links